Oligostigma odrianale is a moth in the family Crambidae. It was described by Schaus in 1924. It is found in Brazil (São Paulo).

References

Acentropinae
Moths described in 1924